Flirt is the ninth album by the American R&B singer Evelyn "Champagne" King, released in 1988 on the EMI-Manhattan label. It was produced by Leon Sylvers III, Teneen Ali, Ron "Have Mercy" Kersey, Alex Brown, Wah Wah Watson, Evan Rogers, and Carl Sturken.

History
The album peaked at #20 on the R&B albums chart. It also reached #192 on the US Billboard 200. It produced the hit singles "Flirt", "Hold On to What You've Got" and "Kisses Don't Lie".

Track listing

Charts

Singles

References

External links

Evelyn "Champagne" King albums
1988 albums
Albums produced by Leon Sylvers III
Albums produced by Carl Sturken and Evan Rogers
EMI America Records albums